Javad Karimi-Ghodousi is an Iranian conservative politician and former military commander who represents Mashhad and Kalat electoral district in the Parliament of Iran since 2008.

References

1959 births
Living people
Members of the 8th Islamic Consultative Assembly
Members of the 9th Islamic Consultative Assembly
Members of the 10th Islamic Consultative Assembly
Deputies of Mashhad and Kalat
Front of Islamic Revolution Stability politicians
Popular Front of Islamic Revolution Forces politicians
People from Mashhad